Balkrishna Pandharinath "Baloo" Gupte  (30 August 1934 – 5 July 2005) was an Indian cricketer. He was a leg-spinner.

Gupte was born in Bombay in British India.  He made his debut under Nari Contractor in 1960–61 against Pakistan led by Fazal Mahmood at the Corporation Stadium in Madras (now Chennai).  He played three Tests for India between 1960–61 and 1964–65. His first class career spanned 1953–53 to 1967-68 playing for Bombay, Bengal and Railways. He died in Bombay on 5 July 2005, after a lengthy illness, aged 70.

He was the younger brother of Subhash Gupte, one of the finest spinners to play for India.

External links
 Rediff.com obituary
Slam Canada report on death

1934 births
2005 deaths
Cricketers from Mumbai
India Test cricketers
Indian cricketers
Mumbai cricketers
Bengal cricketers
Railways cricketers
West Zone cricketers
Indian Universities cricketers
State Bank of India cricketers